The Vanishing Pioneer is a 1928 American silent Western film directed by John Waters and starring Jack Holt, Sally Blane and William Powell. Holt's son, Tim makes his screen debut in this film The film is now lost. It is based on a story by Zane Grey. Parts of the film were shot in Zion National Park and Springdale, Utah.

Plot
A settlement of descendants of historical pioneers is threatened when their water supply is cut off by the large town that is growing nearby. The settlers are led by a rancher who battles back against the corrupt political leadership of the townspeople.

Cast
 Jack Holt as Anthony Ballard/John Ballard
 Sally Blane as June Shelby
 William Powell as John Murdock
 Fred Kohler as Sheriff Murdock
 Guy Oliver as  Mr. Shelby
 Roscoe Karns as Ray Hearn
 Tim Holt as John Ballard, age 7
 Marcia Manon as The Apron Woman

References

External list
 
 The Vanishing Pioneers at Silent Era Film
 

1928 films
1928 Western (genre) films
Lost Western (genre) films
American black-and-white films
Films shot in Utah
Lost American films
1928 lost films
Silent American Western (genre) films
Films directed by John Waters (director born 1893)
Paramount Pictures films
1920s American films